Sävast AIF is a Swedish football club located in Sävast which is a neighbourhood of Boden, Norrbotten County.

Background
Sävast AIF was formed in 1977 with five sections covering Skiing, Tennis, Basketball, Football and Orienteering.  In 1996 the separate sports split away from the club, partly because it was difficult to form a main board. Everyone wanted to work with their own sport leaving football to maintain the identity of Sävast AIF.

Sävast AIF has at most run 17 teams catering for approximately 400 young people. Today Sävast AIF caters for approximately 230 young people in training with girls and boys teams in addition to the senior team.

Since their foundation Sävast AIF has participated mainly in the middle and lower divisions of the Swedish football league system.  The club currently plays in Division 3 Norra Norrland which is the fifth tier of Swedish football. They play their home matches at the Boden Arena in Boden.

Sävast AIF are affiliated to the Norrbottens Fotbollförbund.

Season to season

Attendances

In recent seasons Sävast AIF have had the following average attendances:

Footnotes

External links
 Sävast AIF – Official website

Sport in Norrbotten County
Football clubs in Norrbotten County
Association football clubs established in 1977
1977 establishments in Sweden